Anna Aleksandrovna Rodionova ( born 21 November 1996) is a Russian former artistic gymnast. She competed at the 2013 World Championships and won a bronze medal at the 2014 European Championships.

Junior career

2010 
At the 2010 Russian National Championships, Rodionova won all-around bronze in the Candidate for Master of Sport division behind Anastasia Grishina and Anastasia Sidorova with a two-day total of 111.750. She also won bronze on vault and silver on uneven bars. Rodionova made her international debut at the 2010 Pacific Rim Championships. She won a bronze medal in the all-around with a 53.450 behind Americans Jordyn Wieber and Kyla Ross, and she finished sixth on vault and beam. She competed at the 2010 Eurasian Youth Games and won team gold with Anastasia Sidorova, Kristina Sidorova, Evgenia Shelgunova, and Maria Dunayeva. Rodionova won silver in the all-around, uneven bars, and balance beam.

2011 
Rodionova won three bronze medals in the Junior Master of Sport division of the 2011 Russian National Championships. She finished behind Anastasia Grishina and Anastasia Sidorova in the all-around with a two-day total of 106.025. Her other bronze medals were won on vault and beam. She competed at the 2011 City of Jesolo Trophy and won silver in the junior team competition with Grishina, Anastasia Sidorova, Kristina Sidorova, Shelgunova, and Yulia Chemaryova. Rodionova had a poor performance, scoring only 49.900 in the all-around. Rodionova competed at the 2011 European Youth Summer Olympic Festival where the Russian team finished in fourth. She finished 5th in the all-around final with a 53.850. She finished 7th in the balance beam final and 5th in the floor final.

Senior career

2012 
In January, Rodionova was selected for the Olympic training squad which was for the gymnasts that could have contended for a spot on the Russian Olympic team. She was the youngest gymnast selected. At the 2012 Russian National Championships, Rodionova placed eighth in the all-around with a 54.434. She finished fourth on the uneven bars and seventh on balance beam. Rodionova's first senior international meet was the 2012 City of Jesolo Trophy. Along with Anastasia Grishina, Yulia Inshina, and Yulia Belokobylskaya, she won a bronze medal in the team event. She finished 14th in the all-around with a 54.300, but Grishina was the only Russian to score higher than her. Rodionova competed at the 2012 Russian Cup where the Volga team won bronze. She finished tenth in the all-around with a 51.100. She was not selected to compete at the 2012 Summer Olympics. She competed at the Stuttgart World Cup and won team gold with Aliya Mustafina, Kristina Goryunova, and Inshina.

2013 
Rodionova's first meet of the season was the Anadia World Cup where she place eighth on the uneven bars. She competed at the 2013 Russian Cup where the Volga Federal District team won silver behind Saint Petersburg. She finished fourth in the all-around with a 55.093. In the event finals, Rodionova finished sixth on uneven bars and balance beam.

2013 World Championships 
After Ksenia Afanasyeva had ankle surgery, Mustafina, Tatiana Nabieva, and Maria Paseka were named to the 2013 World Championship team. The fourth spot was between Viktoria Komova and Rodionova. Komova, who had viral meningitis, was told not to compete by doctors. Originally, Rodionova was scheduled to do balance beam only. However, Paseka withdrew due to back injury, and Nabieva suffered a fall that caused a large bruise on her forehead, and she only competed uneven bars. Rodionova competed all-around in the qualification round. She qualified for the all-around final in fifteenth with a 54.599. She qualified for the balance beam final in fourth behind Larisa Iordache, Shang Chunsong, and Kyla Ross with a 14.466. She finished sixteenth in the all-around final with a 53.298. She finished in last place in the balance beam final after falling on her Arabian salto.

After the World Championships, Rodionova competed at the 2013 Elite Gym Massilia with Alla Sosnitskaya, Ekaterina Kramarenko, and Evgenia Shelgunova. The team won silver behind Romania, and Rodionova finished tenth in the all-around with a 53.550. She finished sixth in the uneven bars final with a 12.233. She and her teammates – Kramarenko, Mustafina, and Nabieva – won silver behind China at the Stuttgart World Cup.

2014 
In March 2014, Rodionova competed at the Cottbus World Cup event with Maria Kharenkova, Polina Fedorova and Daria Spiridonova. She qualified to the uneven bars final in second place and in the final won the silver medal behind Sophie Scheder of Germany. In May 2014, she competed at the European Championships in Sofia, Bulgaria. In qualifications she contributed scores of 13.933 on vault and 14.866 on uneven bars. In the team finals she contributed a score of 13.433 on uneven bars towards the Russian team's bronze medal finish. In August she competed at the Russian Cup and finished fourth with her team and sixth on the uneven bars.

Rodionova announced her retirement in 2015. After the 2014 European Championships, she sustained an ankle injury that she never recovered from.

Competitive history

References

1996 births
Living people
Russian female artistic gymnasts
2014 in gymnastics
21st-century Russian women